Henry Hussey may refer to:

Henry Hussey (1361–1409), MP for Sussex
Henry Hussey (died 1557), MP for New Shoreham, Lewes, Gatton and Horsham
Henry Hussey (fl. 1529) (died 1541/44), MP for Horsham
Henry Hussey (pastor) (1825–1903), printer, preacher and author in South Australia
Several Barons Hussey:
Henry Hussey, 1st Baron Hussey (1265–1332), English soldier and politician
Henry Hussey, 2nd Baron Hussey (1292–1349), English nobleman
Henry Hussey, 3rd Baron Hussey (died 1349)
Henry Hussey, 4th Baron Hussey (died 1384)
Henry Hussey, 5th Baron Hussey (1362–1409)
Henry Hussey, 6th Baron Hussey (died 1460)